Renaissance: The Masters Series, Part 10 is the tenth installment from the Masters Series from Renaissance Recordings mixed by Dave Seaman. The release is supported by an extensive touring schedule, to create awareness of the product in all the major territories, the tour is consistent with the artwork from the album to create an authentic Renaissance feel in the clubs. The Masters Series is one of the most famous compilation series in the dance music industry like Global Underground, with Seaman's contributions to series they have collectively sold over 130,000 copies globally.

Track listing

Reviews

The album features a two disc electro house style by Dave Seaman, with smooth transitions and deep bass from artists like Fairmont, Gui Boratto, Wally López, Samim, Sasha, MOS and Underworld, which show his growing electronic style since his "Therapy Sessions". The album begins with the bass monster of Apparat's - "Not A Number", with the keyboards tones like those from The Doors that blend in with the atmosphere of the keyboard synth from Fairmont & Dusty Kid's "Cowboys". Later Wally López's is included with Patric La Funk’s remix which standsout with hazy tech edges with a solid beat. Seaman changes his style into more tech, with the likes of Gui Boratto, Stel and Christian Fischer making the sound more minimal house. Skylark’s track "Elevator" combines progressive house with disco, tech house and tribal.
The entrance of disc two with Johannes Heil's "The Coming" is a piece including tribal drumbeats compounding slowly, followed by synth-and-bass lines of Tim Deluxe's "You Got Tha Touch (Martin Buttrich Vox Mix)" with smooth beats interlaced and funked-up vocals which rise to high pitch sounds increasing and later fading melodically. Later he mixes Mugwump with "Memory Lane Refund (Acid Retraxion Mix)" with tech funk and later ranging to sounds from Solumun's moody song "Deadman", Sol & Grimm's "Exuma" and Josh Gabriel's recent track "Azora" which will be featured in his first solo album since the separation of Gabriel & Dresden in 2008. Seaman also includes three works from Popof, his collaboration with Nina on "Blablabla", his track "Brain On The Side" and a remix of Solaris Heights' "No Trace".
Seaman's mash-up of Oliver Huntemann's "Bakery" with Meat Katie & D. Rameriz's "Stop The Revolution (Dubfire Mix)" changed the style of the compilation into more epic sci-fi deep leading progressive sounds similar to those from Nubreed 001.
The compilation finishes with Umek's "Faithfull Nights" track which sounds like techno-trance from the late 90s.

References

DJ mix albums
2008 compilation albums